FGL may refer to:

 FGL Productions, a French record company
 Fidelity & Guaranty Life, an American insurer
 Fifth-generation programming language
 Flagler Global Logistics, an American logistics company
 Florida Georgia Line, an American country music duo 
 Florida Greyhound Lines, a defunct American bus operator
 FGL Sports Ltd., a Canadian sporting goods retailer
 Foster's Group, an Australian brewer
 Fulmar Gas Line, in the United Kingdom
 Futura Gael, a defunct Irish airline
 Federico García Lorca, a Spanish poet and playwright